Gabriel Alberto Azucena (born September 23, 1988), who goes by the stage name GAWVI (formerly G-Styles), is an American Christian hip hop artist and music producer, formerly for Reach Records. Born in the Bronx, New York, he has released three extended plays, five albums, and twenty-three singles including his songs; "In the Water" and "Late Nights." His career commenced in 2008, doing production work for Lecrae and Trip Lee, who continue to be his most consistent collaborators. In early 2016, he was officially signed to Reach Records. In early 2022, Reach Records ended their professional relationship with Gawvi.

Personal life
Gawvi was born Gabriel Alberto Azucena, in The Bronx, New York, to a father from El Salvador and a mother from the Dominican Republic.  He was raised in Miami, Florida.

He was married to Brianna Azucena. In January 2022 Gawvi announced that he had separated with her in 2020.

Music career

Career beginnings, record producing, and Reach Records (2008–2015)
He started his music production career in 2008, most notably working with Lecrae and Trip Lee. His career led to him acquiring a recording contract with Reach Records as both an artist and in-house record producer. He won a GMA Dove Award at the 46th GMA Dove Awards in the category of Rap/Hip Hop Album of the Year, for his production work on Anomaly by Lecrae.

Lost in Hue, Holding Hue, We Belong, and 954 (2016–2017)
On  July 29, 2016, Gawvi released his debut extended play Lost in Hue. Jesus Freak Hideout rated the E.P. (extended play) three out of five stars, claiming it to be a unique move made by Reach. Lost in Hue flew off the shelves, sitting at No. 1 on the iTunes top-selling dance albums chart. On September 9, 2016, Gawvi released his second extend play, Holding Hue, and was given a five-star rating by JFH's Liam Jackson, who said that  "Free" featuring T-Jay was the only song that was "not that good.” On March 31, 2017, he released his debut studio album We Belong, to acclaim in the CCM (contemporary Christian music) community and debuting at No. 19 in iTunes. Gawvi received his second Dove Award in 2017 for his production on Trip Lee's album The Waiting Room.

Panorama, Heathen, and Noche Juvenil (2018–present)
Gawvi released his second album Panorama on October 17, 2018, featuring the song "Fight for Me" (with Lecrae), which won Rap/Hip Hop song of the year at the 50th GMA Dove Awards. 
On April 10, 2020, Gawvi released his third album, Heathen, which was nominated for Rap/Hip Hop album of the year at the 51st GMA Dove Awards. On March 26, 2021, Gawvi released his fourth full album, Noche Juvenil, which featured all songs recorded in Spanish, featuring Spanish-speaking artists from the Christian hip hop scene. On January 30, 2022, Reach Records ended their professional relationship with Gawvi.

Discography

Albums

Extended plays

Singles

As a lead artist

As a featured artist

Other appearances

Awards

GMA Dove Awards 

|-
|rowspan="2"| 2019 || "Fight For Me || Rap/Hip Hop Recorded of the Year || 
|-
| PANORAMA || Rap/Hip Hop Album of the Year || 
|}

References

External links
 
 AllMusic credits
 

1988 births
Living people
American performers of Christian hip hop music
Musicians from New York City
Musicians from Miami
Musicians from Atlanta
Performers of Christian electronic dance music
Rappers from the Bronx
Rappers from Miami
Rappers from Atlanta
Songwriters from New York (state)
Songwriters from Florida
Songwriters from Georgia (U.S. state)
21st-century American rappers
Reach Records artists
Hispanic and Latino American musicians
Trap musicians
American electronic dance music musicians